Leucocelis is a genus of chafer beetles belonging to the family Scarabaeidae.

Species

 Leucocelis abbotti
 Leucocelis abdita
 Leucocelis abessinica
 Leucocelis adelpha
 Leucocelis adspersa
 Leucocelis aeneicollis
 Leucocelis alboguttata
 Leucocelis albomaculata
 Leucocelis albopilosa
 Leucocelis albosticta
 Leucocelis aldabrensis
 Leucocelis allardi
 Leucocelis amethystina
 Leucocelis amitina
 Leucocelis amoena
 Leucocelis amplicollis
 Leucocelis angustiformis
 Leucocelis annae
 Leucocelis annulipes
 Leucocelis apicalis
 Leucocelis bouyeri
 Leucocelis brevis
 Leucocelis brunneipennis
 Leucocelis bucobensis
 Leucocelis canui
 Leucocelis chionosticta
 Leucocelis chrysocephala
 Leucocelis cincticollis
 Leucocelis coerulescens
 Leucocelis cognata
 Leucocelis collarti
 Leucocelis congoensis
 Leucocelis consobrina
 Leucocelis couturieri
 Leucocelis cupricollis
 Leucocelis decellei
 Leucocelis descarpentriesi
 Leucocelis discicollis
 Leucocelis diversiventris
 Leucocelis elegans
 Leucocelis feana
 Leucocelis ferranti
 Leucocelis franki
 Leucocelis fuscoaenea
 Leucocelis garnieri
 Leucocelis giannatellii
 Leucocelis grandis
 Leucocelis haemorrhoidalis
 Leucocelis haroldi
 Leucocelis hiekei
 Leucocelis hildebrandti
 Leucocelis holdhausi
 Leucocelis intermedia
 Leucocelis irentina
 Leucocelis ivoirensis
 Leucocelis jeanneli
 Leucocelis kristenseni
 Leucocelis lacrymans
 Leucocelis latefasciata
 Leucocelis lateriguttata
 Leucocelis lerui
 Leucocelis limbata
 Leucocelis lucidicollis
 Leucocelis lunata
 Leucocelis lunicollis
 Leucocelis maculicollis
 Leucocelis maraisi
 Leucocelis marginata
 Leucocelis melaena
 Leucocelis melanopyga
 Leucocelis morettoi
 Leucocelis mulsanti
 Leucocelis niansana
 Leucocelis nigrithorax
 Leucocelis nitidula
 Leucocelis niveoguttata
 Leucocelis niveosticta
 Leucocelis parallelocollis
 Leucocelis pauliani
 Leucocelis petit
 Leucocelis plebeja
 Leucocelis polyspila
 Leucocelis polysticta
 Leucocelis pouillaudei
 Leucocelis producta
 Leucocelis puncticollis
 Leucocelis quadriguttata
 Leucocelis refulgens
 Leucocelis rhodesiana
 Leucocelis rubra
 Leucocelis ruficauda
 Leucocelis rufiventris
 Leucocelis rufocincta
 Leucocelis semicuprea
 Leucocelis septicollis
 Leucocelis similis
 Leucocelis simillima
 Leucocelis spectabilis
 Leucocelis transvaalensis
 Leucocelis triliturata
 Leucocelis triluterata
 Leucocelis uluguruensis
 Leucocelis werneri
 Leucocelis versicolora
 Leucocelis viossati
 Leucocelis viridissima
 Leucocelis viridiventris
 Leucocelis zernyi

References

Cetoniinae